Arnaouti is an islet on the northern coast of Crete in the Aegean Sea. It is just south of the island of Imeri Gramvousa and is located between Imeri Gramvousa and Valenti rock. Administratively, it is located within the municipality of Kissamos, in Chania regional unit.

See also
List of islands of Greece

References

Landforms of Chania (regional unit)
Uninhabited islands of Crete
Mediterranean islands
Islands of Greece